Walton Peak is a sharp peak, 825 m tall, which stands 2 nautical miles (3.7 km) north of Mount Rhamnus and is part of the irregular ridge separating Northeast Glacier from Neny Fjord, on the west coast of Graham Land. First surveyed in 1936 by the British Graham Land Expedition (BGLE) under Rymill, it was resurveyed in 1946 and 1948 by the Falkland Islands Dependencies Survey (FIDS). It is named for Eric W.K. Walton, FIDS engineer at Stonington Island in 1946 and 1947, who in 1946 rescued J.E. Tonkin of FIDS from a crevasse in Northeast Glacier.

Mountains of Graham Land
Fallières Coast